Justine Larbalestier (born 23 September 1967) is an Australian writer of young adult fiction best known for her 2009 novel, Liar.

Personal life
Larbalestier was born and raised in Sydney. She now alternates residence between Sydney and New York City.

In 2001 she married the American science fiction writer Scott Westerfeld, whom she met in New York City in 2000.

Selected works

Nonfiction
 'Ending the Battle of the Sexes? Hermaphroditism in "Venus Plus X" by Theodore Sturgeon and "Motherhood, Etc." by L. Timmel Duchamp', The New York Review of Science Fiction, January 1997, pp. 14–16.
 Opulent Darkness: The Werewolves of Tanith Lee (New Lambton: Nimrod Publications, 1999).  – Babel Handbooks on Fantasy and SF Writers, no. 9 (20 pages) 
 The Battle of the Sexes in Science Fiction (Wesleyan University Press, 2002). 
 Daughters of Earth: Feminist Science Fiction in the Twentieth Century, edited (Wesleyan, 2006).

Fiction as editor

 Zombies vs. Unicorns (Margaret K. McElderry Books, 2010), eds. Larbalestier and Holly Black.

Novels

Magic or Madness trilogy, or Reason Cansino series
Magic or Madness (Penguin, 2005). 
Magic Lessons (Penguin, 2006). 
Magic's Child (Penguin, 2007). 
Other
 How to Ditch Your Fairy (Bloomsbury, 2008). 
 Liar (Bloomsbury, 2009). 
 Team Human (HarperTeen, 2012), Larbalestier and Sarah Rees Brennan. 
 Razorhurst (Allen & Unwin, 2014). 
 My Sister Rosa (Soho Press, 2016).

Short fiction
 "The Cruel Brother" (2001), Strange Horizons, 22 October
 "Where Did You Sleep Last Night?" (2004) in Agog! Smashing Stories (Agog! Press), ed. Cat Sparks

Awards

Magic or Madness won the 2007 Andre Norton Award for Young Adult Science Fiction and Fantasy—as the year's best book published in the US according to American speculative fiction writers.
Daughters of Earth: Feminist Science Fiction won one of Australia's Ditmar Awards in 2007, the William Atheling Jr. Award for Criticism or Review and the Susan Koppelman Award.

Her works have also been among the runners-up for several annual book awards (whose definitions of the award year may vary). 
 The Battle of The Sexes in Science Fiction (2002) was nominated for the Peter McNamara Convenors' Award (one of the Aurealis Awards for Australian publications), for the William J. Atheling Ditmar, and for the Hugo Award for Best Related Book in 2003.
 Magic or Madness (2005) was shortlisted for the 2006 Ethel Turner Award as well as for an Aurealis Award, best Australian YA book, and a Ditmar Award, best Science Fiction or Fantasy novel. It was nominated for the Michigan Library Association Teen Services Division "Thumbs Up Award".
 Magic Lessons (2006) was shortlisted for an Aurealis Award, best Australian YA book, and it was one runner-up for a Locus Award, best YA book—namely, 3rd place in the voting by Locus readers.
 Daughters of Earth (2006) was shortlisted for a British Science Fiction Award. 
 Liar (2009) was another 3rd-place runner-up for a Locus Award, best YA book. It was a 2010 recipient of the Davitt Award.
Razorhurst (2014) was shortlisted for the Ethel Turner Prize for Young People's Literature, New South Wales Premier's Literary Awards 2015, and won the 2014 Aurealis Award for Best Horror Novel.

References

External links
 
 
 

Australian writers of young adult literature
Australian science fiction writers
Australian women novelists
Australian speculative fiction critics
Living people
Writers from Sydney
Science fiction critics
Australian literary critics
Australian women literary critics
Women science fiction and fantasy writers
1967 births
Women writers of young adult literature
20th-century Australian writers
20th-century Australian women writers
21st-century Australian novelists
21st-century Australian women writers